Frenchbeer is a settlement in Devon, England. It is in Dartmoor national park. Fernworthy reservoir is to the south and so is the South Teign river. Chagford is the nearest village with facilities.

Villages in Devon